Brampton is a village and civil parish in Cambridgeshire, England, about  south-west of Huntingdon. It lies within Huntingdonshire, a non-metropolitan district of Cambridgeshire and a historic county of England. According to the 2011 UK census Brampton had a population of 4,862 (slightly down on the 2001 UK census figure of 5,030) A 2019 estimate puts it at 5,462. Brampton is considered a suburb of neighbouring Huntingdon by some, due to its close proximity to the town.

History
Historically Brampton was variously known as Brantune (11th century), Brantone or Bramptone (12th–13th centuries), and Brauntone or Brampton (13th century). Scattered human remains dating back 1600–2000 years have been found in one or more gardens of houses near the local primary school. The origin of these has yet to identified.

In the Domesday Book survey of 1086, Brampton was listed as Brantune in the Hundred of Leightonstone in Huntingdonshire. It had two manors, yielding aggregate rents to their lords of the manors in 1066 of £20, which had increased to £21.5 by 1086. Domesday recorded a total of 42 households, which suggests a population of 125–200. The area expressed in hides (variously defined as the area a team of eight oxen could plough in a season) – , thought to support a household – or as the area that could be assessed as £1 for tax purposes. Brampton was put down for 18 ploughlands in 1086., plus  of meadows,  of woodland, and two water mills. The tax assessment was expressed in geld or danegeld and by 1130 it was being collected annually at rates varying between two and six shillings in the pound. For the Brampton manors the tax liability was 16.3 geld in 1068.

The church and its priest antedate Domesday. The Church of St Mary Magdalene (earlier St Mary the Virgin) consists of a chancel with a north vestry, nave, north aisle, south aisle, west tower, and north and south porches. Its existence is mentioned in Domesday, but very few features today date from before the 14th century.

Brampton has associations with the diarist Samuel Pepys. Legend has it that his fortune is buried somewhere in the village: during the panic caused by the Dutch raid on the Medway in 1667 he buried his gold in the garden of Brampton House and was never sure how much of it he had succeeded in recovering. Brampton was the home of his uncle, Robert Pepys, elder brother of the diarist's father, whose house still stands. Samuel Pepys is known to have stayed there and at the Black Bull Inn in the village. After Robert's death in 1661, a bitter legal dispute arose over the Brampton inheritance, involving Samuel, his father and several other claimants. It was ultimately settled out of court.

Government
Brampton has an elected parish council of 15 members meeting on the third Wednesday of the month. Its second local-government tier is Huntingdonshire District Council based in Huntingdon. Brampton as a district ward has two councillors.

Brampton's highest tier of local government is Cambridgeshire County Council based in Cambridge. (It belonged to the historic and administrative county of Huntingdonshire until 1965, then to the new administrative county of Huntingdon and Peterborough, and since 1974 to the county of Cambridgeshire.) Brampton has one county councillor in the electoral division of Brampton and Kimbolton.

At Westminster, Brampton is in the parliamentary constituency of Huntingdon, represented in the House of Commons by Jonathan Djanogly (Conservative) since 2001. The previous member was John Major (Conservative, 1983–2001).

Geography

Most of Portholme, the UK's largest meadow  falls within the parish of Brampton.

Climate
Brampton, like most of the United Kingdom, has a temperate and oceanic, or Cfb under the Köppen climate classification Eastern areas such as East Anglia are drier, cooler and less windy, with greater daily and seasonal temperature variations than the rest of England. Cambridgeshire has cool onshore coastal breezes further to the east, keeping it warm in summer and cold and frosty in winter.

The nearest weather station for long-term data is at RAF Wyton, 3 mi (5 km) north-east of Huntingdon town centre. More recently Monks Wood,  to the north of Brampton, has also provided data.

Typically 43.2 nights of the year report an air frost.

With annual rainfall at under  a year, the Huntingdon area is among the driest in the UK – 103.4 days on average record at least 1 mm of rain. All averages mentioned refer to the period 1971–2000.

Demography

Population
The earliest census data, from 1801, gives the lowest population figure for Brampton: 1801. The highest 19th-century count, 1281, came in 1851.

All population census figures are from the report Historic Census figures Cambridgeshire to 2011 by Cambridgeshire Insight.

Amenities
The village has retail, medical, dental and veterinary services. Brampton Garden Centre is run by Notcutts, and won an award in 2008 as the best Garden Centre Restaurant in the North Thames area.

Four places offer bar drinking: The Dragoon, The Old Mill, The Black Bull, and the Hare on the Green gastro pub, which reopened in October 2018. The last was formerly the Montaz Tandoori restaurant, and before that The Harrier, in honour of the RAF base located in the village. Drinks are also served to members at The Institute and the Bowls Club. The Grange Hotel, Brampton, once a private residence, closed in 2013 for conversion into housing. A large 18th-century brick building, it had been requisitioned in the Second World War for the American Eighth Air Force. RAF Brampton closed in 2013. Its land was sold for development, with plans submitted for up to 402 new houses.

Brampton has regular buses (Nos 65 and 66) to St Neots, Hinchingbrooke, Huntingdon and Tesco, run by Stagecoach in Huntingdonshire. The nearest rail service is at Huntingdon railway station, 1 miles (2.5 km) to the east.

Brampton Park has an 18-hole golf course featuring the par-3 4th, a signature hole with a green almost completely surrounded by water, often claimed as England's hardest par-3. The village has a large skate park on the Memorial Playing Fields, alongside the Memorial Hall, and in 2013 a Multi Users Games Area (MUGA) was opened. There are also pitches for Association Football and cricket. Huntingdon Racecourse lies within the parish.

Education
Brampton has one school: Brampton Village Primary School. It was classed as good in all main criteria at the most recent Ofsted inspection in March 2012. The previous infants' and junior schools merged in 2007.

The village falls within the catchment area of Hinchingbrooke School

Religious sites
The Anglican church of St Mary Magdalene shares clergy with the parishes of Ellington and Grafham. The Methodist Church on The Green belongs to the St Neots and Huntingdon circuit.

Notable people
Geoff Capes, the Commonwealth shot-put champion and twice winner of the title World's Strongest Man, served as a police officer in Brampton in the 1970s.
Samuel Pepys, diarist famous for his written accounts of historical events during the Stuart period, lived in his uncle, Robert Pepys’ house in Brampton while attending Huntingdon Grammar School in 1644. He was due to inherit the house and is reported to have wanted to retire there.
Carla Humphrey, women's footballer who plays for Liverpool FC.

References

External links

Villages in Cambridgeshire
Huntingdonshire
Civil parishes in Cambridgeshire